Newtonia paucijuga is a species of flowering plant in the family Fabaceae. It is found in Kenya and Tanzania.

Description
The trunk is usually smooth and some shade of grey or greyish brown, and the small twigs are densely covered with reddish-brown hairs when young. There is a short gland between each pair of pinnae and further short glands between each pair of leaflets. The white flowers are bisexual and have parts in fives. The seeds are flat and oblong, with a papery wing.

Distribution and habitat
Newtonia paucijuga is native to East Africa, where its range extends from southeastern Kenya to southern Tanzania. These types of habitat are under threat from human development.

Status
This tree is fairly common in suitable habitat in East Africa, for example in the Shimba Hills in Kenya, but it has a limited range, being only found in fragments of coastal and gallery forest, and the International Union for Conservation of Nature has assessed its conservation status as "vulnerable".

References

paucijuga
Flora of Kenya
Flora of Tanzania
Vulnerable plants
Taxonomy articles created by Polbot